Filomeno Mata is a town and municipality in Veracruz, Mexico. It is located in central zone of the state, about 298 km from state capital Xalapa. It has a surface of 62.51 km2.

The municipality of Filomeno Mata is delimited to the north by Coahuitlan, to the north-east by Mecatlán, to the south and to the west by Puebla State.

It produces principally maize and coffee.

In Filomeno Mata, in August takes place the celebration in honor to Santa Rosa de Lima, Patron of the town.

The weather in Filomeno Mata is warm-medium all year with rains in summer and autumn.

References

External links 

  Municipal Official webpage
  Municipal Official Information

Municipalities of Veracruz